Life in a Tin Can is the Bee Gees' eleventh studio album (ninth worldwide), released in January 1973.

Background
The Bee Gees travelled to Los Angeles to record Life in a Tin Can. However, it was unable to prevent a commercial decline with the album criticised for a lack of innovation. Despite its low sales and poor chart performance, Life in a Tin Can was awarded "Album of the Year" by Record World magazine. It was the first Bee Gees album to bear the RSO label in the US.

Four of the eight songs were written by all three brothers with the other four being Barry Gibb compositions. "Saw a New Morning" was a No. 1 hit in Hong Kong. During the sessions, Robin Gibb had to leave the sessions suddenly when his son Spencer was born a month early. He returned to Los Angeles a week or so later to continue on into the next album. The musicians who participated on Life in a Tin Can were Jim Keltner, Sneaky Pete Kleinow, Tommy Morgan, Jerome Richardson, Ric Grech, Jane Getz and Johnny Pate.

When asked by Billboard why they moved from London to Los Angeles, Maurice says: "We don't want to talk about it yet. But we're going to attempt a concept album that's a major departure from our usual Bee Gees trademarks. And if that doesn't work out, we'll do something else".

Critical reception
Rolling Stone called the album "vaguely pleasant and certainly innocuous enough to fit right in with the prevalent Seventies soft-rock ambience."

Track listing
All tracks written and composed by Barry, Robin and Maurice Gibb, except for songs with asterisks, which are by Barry Gibb.

Chart performance
Album

Singles

Personnel

Credits from Joseph Brennan.
Bee Gees
Barry Gibb – lead, harmony and backing vocals, rhythm guitar
Robin Gibb – lead, harmony and backing vocals
Maurice Gibb – harmony and backing vocals; bass guitar (except #1 (side 1) and #1 (side 2)); rhythm guitar, piano, various keyboards

Guest musicians
Alan Kendall – lead guitar
Sneaky Pete Kleinow – lap steel guitar on #3 (side 1) and #3 (side 1)
Tommy Morgan – harmonica on #3 (side 1) and #2 (side 2)
Jerome Richardson – flute on #4 (side 1)
Rick Grech – violin and bass guitar on #1 (side 2)
Jane Getz – piano on #3 (side 2)
Jim Keltner – drums
Johnny Pate – orchestral arrangement

Production
Mike D. Stone – engineer of the Record Plant in Los Angeles, California
Chuck Leary – engineer

References

Bee Gees albums
1973 albums
RSO Records albums
Albums arranged by Johnny Pate
Albums produced by Barry Gibb
Albums produced by Robin Gibb
Albums produced by Maurice Gibb
Folk rock albums by English artists
Country rock albums by English artists
Soft rock albums by English artists